Étienne de Montety (born 2 May 1965 in 15th arrondissement of Paris) is a French writer and journalist.

Biography 
Étienne de Montety studied at the University of Paris X-Nanterre, where he obtained a master's degree in law and political science and a postgraduate degree in political science. Deputy Editor-in-chief of Le Figaro and director of the Figaro littéraire (Supplement published on Thursday) since 2006, he led the pages "Debates Opinions" of the daily between 2008 and 2012. He runs a daily chronicle on the vocabulary entitled "Un Dernier mot".

Works 
1994: Thierry Maulnier, biography, Éditions Julliard
1996: Salut à Kléber Haedens, Éditions Grasset
2001: Honoré d'Estienne d'Orves, un héros français, Éditions Perrin – Prix littéraire de l'armée de terre - Erwan Bergot, 2001
2006: Des hommes irréguliers, Perrin
2009: L'Article de la mort, novel, Éditions Gallimard – Prix Ève Delacroix
2013: La Route du salut, novel, Gallimard – Prix des Deux Magots
2013: Encore un mot : billets du « Figaro », Points
2015: Un dernier mot : billets du Figaro, Points
2017: L'Amant noir, novel, Gallimard – Prix Jean-Freustié
2020: La grande épreuve, 2020, Stock – Grand prix du roman de l'Académie française

References

External links 
 La déroute de Montéty et les mœurs de l'édition on Mediapart
 Prix des Deux Magots : Étienne de Montety primé pour La Route du salut on Le Figaro (29 January 2014)
 Étienne de Montety on Le Figaro 
 Étienne de Montety on France Culture
 Étienne de Montety on France Inter
 Le Prix des Deux Magots pour Etienne de Montety on BibliObs (28 January 2014)
 LIBRE OPINION de Etienne de MONTETY : Le sacrifice et les égoïsmes on Association de soutien à l'Armée française (30 May 2016)

1965 births
Living people
20th-century French journalists
21st-century French journalists
21st-century French writers
Writers from Paris
Grand Prix du roman de l'Académie française winners
Le Figaro people